Love Gets Strange: The Songs of John Hiatt is a 1993 compilation album of songs written by John Hiatt and performed by various artists.

Track listing
All songs written by John Hiatt, except where noted.
"Love Gets Strange" – Don Dixon – 5:39
"Washable Ink" – The Neville Brothers – 4:03
"She Said the Same Things to Me" – Johnny Adams – 4:09
"When We Ran" – Katy Moffatt – 4:57
"Pink Bedroom" – Rosanne Cash – 3:12
"Someplace Where Love Can't Find Me" – Marshall Crenshaw – 4:04
"Drive South" – Kelly Willis – 3:32
"Angel Eyes" (Hiatt, Fred Koller) – The Jeff Healey Band – 4:43
"I'll Never Get Over You" – Jo-El Sonnier – 4:55
"She Don't Love Nobody" – Nick Lowe – 3:25
"She Loves the Jerk" – Rodney Crowell – 3:40
"Something Happens" – Dave Edmunds – 3:16
"Icy Blue Heart" – Emmylou Harris – 4:10
"The Real One" – John Doe – 4:15
"Where is the Next One Coming From?" – Mitch Ryder – 3:57
"The Way We Make a Broken Heart" – Rosanne Cash – 3:57
"Any Single Solitary Heart" (Hiatt, Mike Porter) – Kris McKay – 3:55
"Confidence Man" – The Jeff Healey Band – 3:12

References

1993 compilation albums
Rhino Records albums